Deborah Dancy, also known as Deborah Muirhead (born 1949), is an American painter of large-scale abstractions in oil; she is also a printmaker and mixed media artist. Her work is also known to encompass digital photography. In 1981, she began to  teach at the University of Connecticut, Storrs, where she taught painting for thirty-five years until her retirement in 2017. She has received awards such as a John Simon Guggenheim Foundation Fellowship, Women’s Studio Workshop Studio Residency Grant, and a YADDO fellowship.

Early life and education 
Dancy was born in 1949 in Bessemer, Alabama. She was born into an African American family who treasured their heritage and ancestry. Dancy received her BFA from Illinois Wesleyan University in 1973, as well as an MS in printmaking and MFA in painting from Illinois State University in 1976 and 1979, respectively.

Career 
Her painting "Seed Travel" appeared in the Stamford Museum and Nature Center. Dancy taught painting at the University of Connecticut, Storrs for thirty-five years before retiring in 2017.

Dancy’s works are in the permanent collections of numerous galleries and academic institutions, some of which include the Museum of Fine Arts Boston, the Birmingham Museum of Art in Alabama, and the Baltimore Museum of Art. Dancy was also nominated for a Connecticut Children's Book Award for Illustration for The Freedom Business as an illustrator and co-author.

Deborah Dancy was the art director and the illustrator of The Freedom Business, a book by her friend, Marilyn Nelson.

Public collections 

Allen Memorial Art Museum, Oberlin College, Oberlin, Ohio
Baltimore Museum of Art
Birmingham Museum of Art, Birmingham, Ala.
Cedar Rapids Museum of Art, Cedar Rapids, Iowa
Columbia Museum of Art, Columbia, S.C.
Davison Art Center, Wesleyan University, Middletown, Conn.
Detroit Institute of Arts
Figge Art Museum, Davenport, Iowa 
Fine Art Museum, Bardo Arts Center, Western Carolina University, Cullowhee, N.C.
Fine Arts Museum, Vanderbilt University, Nashville, Tenn.
Grinnell College, Grinnell, Iowa
Hunter Museum of American Art, Chattanooga, Tenn.
Kemper Museum of Contemporary Art, Kansas City, Mo.
Mead Art Museum, Amherst College, Amherst, Mass.
Montgomery Museum of Fine Arts, Montgomery, Ala.
Museum of Fine Arts, Boston
Samek Art Gallery, Bucknell University, Lewisburg, Penn.
Snite Museum of Art, University of Notre Dame, Notre Dame, Ind.
Spencer Museum of Art, University of Kansas, Lawrence, Kans.
United States Embassy, Yaoundé, Cameroon

Awards and honors 

Women's Studio Workshop Studio Residency Grant
Banff Creative Residency Program Grant
University of Connecticut School of Fine Arts Outstanding Faculty Award
 The University of Connecticut Chancellor’s Research Fellowship
American Antiquarian Society William Randolph Hearst Artist and Writers Creative Arts Fellowship
 Nexus Press Artist Book Project Residency Award
 Visual Studies Press Artist in Residency Award
Louis Comfort Tiffany Foundation Nominee
John Simon Guggenheim Foundation Fellowship
New England Foundation for the Arts Regional National Endowment for the Arts, Individual Artist Grant
Joan Mitchell Foundation Nominee
 Juror's Merit Award, New American Talent: Laguna Gloria Museum
 Connecticut Commission on the Arts Individual Artist Grant
Yale University Visiting Faculty Fellow
YADDO Fellowship
 Connecticut Book Award Illustration Nominee - “The Freedom Business”

Bibliography 
Armstrong, Kathleen, et al. “Children's Literature Reviews: 2008 Poetry Notables.” Language Arts, vol. 86, no. 6, 2009, pp. 468–472. JSTOR
“Book Design, Digital Imaging and Photography.” Clarellen, Clarellen and Cary Graphic Arts Press, New York, 2001
Danza, Emmie. “Deborah Dancy, Chasing the Light.” Gallery Artist Deborah Dancy Reviewed on The Drawing Center Column, "Annotations.", The Drawing Center, 27 June 2013
Edwards, Jeff. “‘It’s a Constant Struggle to Keep the ‘Thingness’ at Bay’: An Interview with Deborah Dancy.” Artpulse, 2015
“Front Matter.” African American Review, vol. 41, no. 3, 2007 
 “Flatfile Collection, Queen Bea.” Artspace New Haven. 2016
King, Leslie. “Gumbo Ya Ya : Anthology of Contemporary African-American Women Artists.” Hathi Trust Digital Library, Midmarch Arts Press, 1995
McNALLY, OWEN. “Painter Muirhead peers through a history, darkly.” Courant.com, Hartford Courant, 13 Sept. 2018
Mercer, Valerie J., et al. “Examining Identities.” Bulletin of the Detroit Institute of Arts, vol. 86, no. 1/4, 2012, pp. 66–87. JSTOR, www.jstor.org/stable/43492326.
Mobilio, Albert. “The Bookness of Not-Books: Modern and Contemporary Artists' Books,” The Paris Review, 22 Jun 2017
Nelson, Marilyn. “The Freedom Business (Ca. 1790).” Venture Smith and the Business of Slavery and Freedom, edited by James Brewer Stewart. by James O. Horton, University of Massachusetts Press, 2010, pp. 257–258. JSTOR, www.jstor.org/stable/j.ctt5vk4gq.16.
Perosino, Bruno. “Marking 35 Years: The Work of Deborah Dancy.” The William Benton Museum of Art, 18 Jul 2017
Raynor, Vivian. “Spirit in the Wood/Paint.” The New York Times, Sunday, 26 Feb 1989
Raynor, Vivian, “Stamford Museum.” The New York Times, Sunday: 2 May 1989
Robert, Kiener. “In Works with a Visceral, Spontaneous Feel, Deborah Dancy Explores the Amorphous Zone between Abstraction and Representation.” New England Home Magazine,
Robin Kahn. ROBIN KAHN, 1 Jan 1970.
Rosoff, Patricia. “Small Vistas, The 10-Year Show at 100 Pearl.” Hartford Advocate, 15 Jul 2004.
Zimmer, William. “ART; A Glimpse of Contemporary Taste.” The New York Times, The New York Times, 25 Feb 1996.
Zimmer, William. “Connecticut Biennial.” The New York Times, 14 Apr 1991.

References

American contemporary painters
American women painters
African-American women artists
American printmakers
University of Connecticut faculty
1949 births
Living people
American women printmakers
American women academics
African-American painters
African-American printmakers
21st-century African-American people
21st-century African-American women
20th-century African-American people
20th-century African-American women